Yumnam Yaima Singh (28 August 1922 – 3 March 2017) was an Indian politician. He was a Member of Parliament, representing Inner Manipur in the Lok Sabha the lower house of India's Parliament. He died on 3 March 2017, at the age of 94.

References

External links
 Official biographical sketch in Parliament of India website

1922 births
2017 deaths
India MPs 1991–1996
Lok Sabha members from Manipur
Manipur Peoples Party politicians